Mosaic corydoras and reticulated corydoras are common names shared by two similar but distinct members of the genus Corydoras:

Corydoras haraldschultzi, known by the common names mosaic corydoras and reticulated corydoras.
Corydoras reticulatus, known by the common names mosaic corydoras, reticulated corydoras, network corydoras, and network catfish